Robert Joseph Wilke (May 18, 1914 – March 28, 1989) was an American film and television actor noted primarily for his roles as villains, mostly in Westerns.

Early years 
Wilke was a native of Cincinnati. Before going into acting, he had a variety of jobs, including working in a high-dive act at the Chicago World's Fair in 1933–1934.

Career 
Wilke started as a stuntman in the 1930s and his first appearance on screen was in San Francisco (1936). He soon began to acquire regular character parts, mainly as a heavy, and made his mark when, along with Lee Van Cleef and Sheb Wooley, he played one of the "three men waiting at the station" in High Noon (1952).

Television westerns
Wilke appeared in many, if not most, television westerns, including seven episodes each of NBC's Laramie and  CBS's Gunsmoke.

He appeared eight times from 1951 to 1953 on the syndicated western series The Range Rider. He was a guest star five times each on Cheyenne and Bonanza, four times on Wagon Train and Death Valley Days, and three times on Rawhide, The Cisco Kid, Tombstone Territory, and Daniel Boone. He appeared twice on The Virginian, Cimarron Strip, and The Guns of Will Sonnett, and once on The Tall Man, Sky King, Lancer, The Wild Wild West, and The Monroes.

Wilke appeared as a dishonest fight promoter in the 1958 episode "The Fighter" of NBC's western series, Bat Masterson, fighting with Gene Barry, who played Masterson.

In 1960 Wilke was cast as Red Dog Hanlon in the episode "End of a Dream" of the NBC western series Riverboat.

In 1961 Wilke appeared as Gil Fletcher, a corrupt marshal in Billings, Montana, in the episode "The Fatal Step" of NBC's Laramie.

In the 1965-66 television season Wilke played Marshal Sam Corbett, in the 34-episode ABC western series The Legend of Jesse James,  who (in vain) tried to capture the outlaws Jesse James and his brother Frank James. In 1960 Wilke played Jesse James' associate Cole Younger in the short-lived NBC western series Overland Trail with William Bendix and Doug McClure.

Wilke played a hired gun in The Far Country (1954) and continued to work steadily in films and television over the next 20 years. More western credits followed in Man of the West (1958) and numerous lesser-known films.

In 1960 Wilke appeared in The Magnificent Seven as the railroad bully, Wallace, who was quickly killed off by James Coburn. He also appeared in Days of Heaven (1978) as the farm foreman.

In 1966 Wilke was cast as the courageous Sheriff McBain in the episode "Brute Angel" of the syndicated western series Death Valley Days.

Wilke guest-starred on many other television westerns, including Maverick, Tales of Wells Fargo, Have Gun – Will Travel, Bronco, The Westerner, Lawman, Wanted Dead or Alive, Zorro, The Rifleman, and Rango.

Other roles
Outside of westerns, Wilke appeared in From Here to Eternity (1953) and 20,000 Leagues Under the Sea (1954). In the former film, Wilke's character tells Maggio he has guard duty, which begins a series of events leading to the plot's climax. In the later film, he was cast as the first mate of the Nautilus. It is Wilke who, in the film, warns Captain Nemo that a giant squid is approaching the ship, and who utters the line, "We understand, sir, and we're with you", when Nemo announces his final intentions.

His drama/adventure roles included U.S. Marshal, Peter Gunn, Tarzan, Bourbon Street Beat, 77 Sunset Strip, and The Untouchables. In 1953 Wilke, playing a henchman for an East European counterfeiter, shoved John Hamilton and George Reeves into side-by-side steam cabinets, locked them in, turned up the thermostat to charbroil and left them to bake in "Perry White's Scoop", an episode of the Adventures of Superman.

Wilke played Deputy Sheriff Connors in the 1963 episode, "The Case of the Drowsy Mosquito" on CBS' Perry Mason. He portrayed golf professional Danny Donnigan in a 1962 episode, "Robbie the Caddie", on the ABC sitcom, My Three Sons. In 1964 Wilke played Tom Carter, the golf instructor of Lucy Carmichael (Lucille Ball), in The Lucy Show episode "Lucy Takes Up Golf".

Wilke's final film role was somewhat against type as Gen. Barnicke in the 1981 comedy Stripes.

Golf
Wilke was an excellent golfer. Author Dan Jenkins, in his book The Dogged Victims of Inexorable Fate, describes a golf match at Riviera Country Club in Los Angeles:
Mr. Wilke joined Mr. Jenkins, Vic Damone, James Garner, Jack Ging, Glen Campbell, Donald O'Connor, and Lindsay Crosby in the first and only Sports Illustrated Open Invitation at Riviera.  The pro at Riviera at the time, Mac Hunter, is quoted as saying, "Bob Wilke used to be head and shoulders better than any of the actors and personalities. And he's still very good. A solid four handicap, but his putting is deteriorating. Wilke must have won more celebrity tournaments than you can count.

Ging edged out Bob Wilke for the win that day.  James Garner also said that Wilke was the best golfer among the showbiz crowd at the Riviera in his book The Garner Files.

In 1966, Wilke was rated the best amateur golfer in Hollywood. In 1960, 1963, and 1964, he won the World Entertainment Championship golf title.

Selected filmography

San Francisco (1936) as Earthquake Survivor (uncredited)
King of the Texas Rangers (1936)
That Man's Here Again (1937) as Extra in Park (uncredited)
San Quentin (1937) as Young Convict in Yard (uncredited)
S.O.S. Coast Guard (1937) as Seaman (uncredited)
Renfrew of the Royal Mounted (1937) as Mountie at Picnic (uncredited)
International Crime (1938) as Bar Patron (uncredited)
The Fighting Devil Dogs (1938) as Marine in Shanghai (uncredited)
Come On, Rangers (1938) (uncredited)
Woman Doctor (1939) as Ambulance Driver (uncredited)
Star Reporter (1939) as Reporter (uncredited)
Street of Missing Men (1939) as Henchman (uncredited)
Man of Conquest (1939) as Texican (uncredited)
S.O.S. Tidal Wave (1939) as Man in TV Studio (uncredited)
Daredevils of the Red Circle (1939) as G-Man (uncredited)
In Old Monterey (1939) as Man on Wagon (uncredited)
Jeepers Creepers (1939) as Gangster
In Old Missouri (1940) as Hillbilly (uncredited)
Grand Ole Opry (1940) as Hillbilly (uncredited)
Adventures of Red Ryder (1940) as Henchman (uncredited)
Hit Parade of 1941 (1940) (uncredited)
Country Fair (1941)
Power Dive (1941) as Barfly (uncredited)
Sierra Sue (1941) as Carnival Spectator (uncredited)
Dick Tracy vs. Crime Inc. (1941) as Cutter Helmsman (uncredited)
Spy Smasher (1942, Serial) as Chief Government Agent [Chs. 1–2, 10-11] (uncredited)
Bells of Capistrano (1942) as Roustabout (uncredited)
The Masked Marvel (1943, Serial) as Rental Garage Thug (uncredited)
Overland Mail Robbery (1943) as Shack Guard (uncredited)
Pistol Packin' Mama (1943) as Bodyguard (uncredited)
California Joe (1943) as Barfly (uncredited)
The Fighting Seabees (1944) as Arriving Construction Worker (uncredited)
Captain America (1944) as Thug with B-10 [Ch. 4] (uncredited)
Beneath Western Skies (1944) as Henchman (uncredited)
Hidden Valley Outlaws (1944) as Rancher (uncredited)
Rosie the Riveter (1944) as Furniture Mover (uncredited)
Cowboy and the Senorita (1944) as Townsman (uncredited)
The Tiger Woman (1944) as Hill Heavy 1[Ch. 2] / Road Heavy (uncredited)
The Yellow Rose of Texas (1944) as Deputy (uncredited)
Marshal of Reno (1944) as Deputy (uncredited)
Call of the Rockies (1944) as Deputy Jim (uncredited)
Bordertown Trail (1944) as Henchman (uncredited)
The San Antonio Kid (1944) as Henchman
Haunted Harbor (1944) as 1st Bartender [Ch. 1] (uncredited)
Stagecoach to Monterey (1944) as Barfly (uncredited)
Cheyenne Wildcat (1944) as Deputy Charlie (uncredited)
Code of the Prairie (1944) as Office Henchman (uncredited)
Sheriff of Sundown (1944) as Bradley - Henchman
Vigilantes of Dodge City (1944) as Henchman 
Zorro's Black Whip (1944) as Bill Slocum (uncredited)
Faces in the Fog (1944) as Photographer (uncredited)
Firebrands of Arizona (1944) as 3rd Deputy (uncredited)
The Big Bonanza (1944) as Rancher (uncredited)
Sheriff of Las Vegas (1944) as Barfly (uncredited)
The Topeka Terror (1945) as Lynch-Mob Member 
Great Stagecoach Robbery (1945) as Stage Guard (uncredited)
Sheriff of Cimarron (1945) as Dobie - Henchman
Earl Carroll Vanities (1945) as Cab Driver (uncredited)
Corpus Christi Bandits (1945) as Steve - Henchman 
Lone Texas Ranger (1945) as Henchman (uncredited)
Santa Fe Saddlemates (1945) as Rawhide
Bells of Rosarita (1945) as Deputy (uncredited)
The Chicago Kid (1945) as Detective (uncredited)
The Man from Oklahoma (1945) as Chauffeur (uncredited)
Trail of Kit Carson (1945) as Dave MacRoy
Hitchhike to Happiness (1945) as Stage Hand (uncredited)
The Purple Monster Strikes (1945) as Dr. Harvey's Assistant (uncredited)
Bandits of the Badlands (1945) as Keller - Henchman
Sunset in El Dorado (1945) as Curley Roberts - Henchman 
Rough Riders of Cheyenne (1945) as Smoke - Henchman 
The Daltons Ride Again (1945) as Posseman (uncredited)
The Phantom Rider (1946) as Indian Rebel 1 (uncredited)
Roaring Rangers (1946) as Outlaw Leader (uncredited)
The Catman of Paris (1946) as The Catman (uncredited)
The Wife of Monte Cristo (1946) as Minor Role (uncredited)
King of the Forest Rangers (1946, Serial) as Carleton - Forest Ranger [Chs. 1, 4–5, 9] (uncredited)
Badman's Territory (1946) as Deputy Marshal (uncredited)
Passkey to Danger (1946) as Police Sergeant (uncredited)
Traffic in Crime (1946) as Hogan's Driver 
Rendezvous with Annie (1946) as MP (uncredited)
Daughter of Don Q (1946) as Smith (uncredited)
Inner Circle (1946) as Cummings - Police Officer 
White Tie and Tails (1946) as Starter (uncredited)
The Crimson Ghost (1946, Serial) as Scott - Armored Car Driver [Ch. 3] (uncredited)
Out California Way (1946) as Nate (uncredited)
The Pilgrim Lady (1947) as Doorman (uncredited)
The Michigan Kid (1947) as Pool Player (uncredited)
The Ghost Goes Wild (1947) as Burglar 
West of Dodge City (1947) as Adams - Henchman (uncredited)
Twilight on the Rio Grande (1947) as Henchman (uncredited)
Buck Privates Come Home (1947) as GI Buddy (uncredited)
Law of the Canyon (1947) as Knife-Throwing Henchman (uncredited)
The Vigilantes Return (1947) as Henchman (uncredited)
Web of Danger (1947) as Station Wagon Driver (uncredited)
Blackmail (1947) as Policeman (uncredited)
The Black Widow (1947) as Cabbie / Jailer (uncredited)
Last Days of Boot Hill (1947) as Bronc Peters (uncredited)
Frontier Outpost (1948)
Six-Gun Law (1948) as Larson - Henchman (uncredited)
G-Men Never Forget (1948, Serial) as Steele - Phony Detective [Ch. 5] (uncredited)
The Wreck of the Hesperus (1948) as Milton (uncredited)
West of Sonora (1948) as Brock - Henchman (uncredited)
Dangers of the Canadian Mounted (1948) as Cpl. Baxter (uncredited)
Carson City Raiders (1948) as Ed Noble 
River Lady (1948) as Man (uncredited)
Daredevils of the Clouds (1948) as Joe
A Southern Yankee (1948) as Confederate Soldier Ordering Cease Fire (uncredited)
Trail to Laredo (1948) as Duke - Henchman (uncredited)
Desperadoes of Dodge City (1948) as Land Agent Runner (uncredited)
Sundown in Santa Fe (1948) as Henchman (uncredited)
Homicide for Three (1948) as Policeman (uncredited)
Federal Agents vs. Underworld, Inc. (1949, Serial) as Zod - Pursuit Plane Pilot [Chs. 10-11]
Ghost of Zorro (1949) as Townsman (uncredited)
Death Valley Gunfighter (1949) as Henchman (uncredited)
Laramie (1949) as Cronin (uncredited)
The Wyoming Bandit (1949) as Sam - Henchman
Flaming Fury (1949) as Patrolman (uncredited)
The James Brothers of Missouri (1949) as Townsman (uncredited)
Post Office Investigator (1949) as Policeman (uncredited)
The Traveling Saleswoman (1950) as Loser (uncredited)
The Blonde Bandit (1950) as Det. Walker 
Mule Train (1950) as Bradshaw - Henchman (uncredited)
The Kid from Texas (1950) as Henchman (uncredited)
Twilight in the Sierras (1950) as Bus Driver (uncredited)
Outcast of Black Mesa (1950) as Curt - Henchman 
Kill the Umpire (1950) as Cactus (uncredited)
Beyond the Purple Hills (1950) as Jim Conners - Henchman (uncredited)
The Desert Hawk (1950) as Camel Driver (uncredited)
Across the Badlands (1950) as Duke Jackson / Keno Jackson 
Frontier Outpost (1950) as Krag Benson
Vengeance Valley (1951) as Cowhand (uncredited)
Saddle Legion (1951) as Hooker - Henchman
GunPlay (1951) as Henchman Winslow 
No Questions Asked (1951) as Police Sergeant (uncredited)
Best of the Badmen (1951) as Jim Younger
Cyclone Fury (1951) as Bunco - Henchman
Pistol Harvest (1951) as Andy Baylor 
Hot Lead (1951) as Stoney Dawson 
Overland Telegraph (1951) as Bellew - Henchman 
Indian Uprising (1952) as Taggart Man (uncredited)
The Las Vegas Story (1952) as Clayton
Road Agent (1952) as Slab Babcock
Laramie Mountains (1952) as Henry Mandel (uncredited)
Carbine Williams (1952) as Guard on Train (uncredited)
High Noon (1952) as Jim Pierce
Hellgate (1952) as Sgt. Maj. Kearn 
Cattle Town (1952) as Keeno 
Fargo (1952) as Link - Henchman
Wyoming Roundup (1952) as Wyatt - Henchman
The Maverick (1952) as Massey 
Cow Country (1953) as Sledge
Powder River (1953) as Will Horn
Arrowhead (1953) as Sgt. Stone
From Here to Eternity (1953) as Sgt. Henderson (uncredited)
War Paint (1953) as Trooper Grady
The Lone Gun (1954) as Hort Moran
Two Guns and a Badge (1954) as Moore - Outlaw
20,000 Leagues Under the Sea (1954) as First Mate of the Nautilus
Death Valley Days (1955, Two Gun Nan)
The Far Country (1955) as  Madden
Smoke Signal (1955) as 1st Sgt. Daly 
Strange Lady in Town (1955) as Karg
Shotgun (1955) as Bentley
Son of Sinbad (1955) as Musa (uncredited)
Wichita (1955) as Ben Thompson
Tarantula (1955) as Ranch Hand (uncredited)
The Lone Ranger (1956) as Cassidy
Backlash (1956) as Jeff Welker
Raw Edge (1956) as Sile Doty
The Rawhide Years (1956) as Neal
Canyon River (1956) as Joe Graycoe
The Vagabond King (1956) as Officer of the Day (uncredited)
Gun the Man Down (1956) as Matt Rankin
Cheyenne (1956) 'Mustang Trail' as Jed Begert
Written on the Wind (1956) as Dan Willis
Hot Summer Night (1957) as Tom Ellis 
Night Passage (1957) as Concho
The Tarnished Angels (1957) as Hank
Return to Warbow (1958) as Red
Man of the West (1958) as Ponch 
Never Steal Anything Small (1959) as Lennie
Spartacus (1960) as Guard Captain
The Magnificent Seven (1960) as Wallace 
Blueprint for Robbery (1961) as Capt. Swanson
The Long Rope (1961) as Ben Matthews
Death Valley Days (1962) 'Susie' as Sergeant Brill
Have Gun Will Travel (1963).
The Gun Hawk (1963) as Johnny Flanders
Shock Treatment (1964) as Technician Mike Newton
Fate Is the Hunter (1964) as Stillman 
Death Valley Days (1965) 'The Journey' as Sergeant Wilks
The Hallelujah Trail (1965) as Chief Five Barrels
Daniel Boone (1964 TV series) (1965) as Toff - S1/E18 "The Sound of Fear"
Morituri (1965) as Cmdr. Kelling (uncredited)
Smoky (1966) as Jeff Nicks
Tony Rome (1967) as Ralph Turpin
The Cheyenne Social Club (1970) as Corey Bannister
A Gunfight (1971) as Marshal Tom Cater
The Resurrection of Zachary Wheeler (1971) as Hugh Fielding
The Boy Who Cried Werewolf (1973) as The Sheriff
Santee (1973) as Deaks
Days of Heaven (1978) as The Farm Foreman
The Sweet Creek County War (1979) as Lucas Derring
The Great Monkey Rip-Off (1979) as Zaerbo
Dallas (1980) 'The Dove Hunt' as Tom Owens
Stripes (1981) as Gen. Barnicke (final film role)

References

External links

 

1914 births
1989 deaths
American male film actors
American male television actors
Male Western (genre) film actors
Deaths from cancer in California
Male actors from Cincinnati
People from Greater Los Angeles
20th-century American male actors
Western (genre) television actors